Clutter
is a term used for unwanted echoes in electronic systems, particularly in reference to radars. Such echoes are typically returned from ground, sea, rain, animals/insects, chaff and atmospheric turbulences, and can cause serious performance issues with radar systems.

Backscatter coefficient 
What one person considers to be clutter, another may consider to be a target. However, targets usually refer to point scatterers and clutter to extended scatterers (covering many range, angle, and Doppler cells). The clutter may fill a volume (such as rain) or be confined to a surface (like land). In principle, all that is required to estimate the radar return (backscatter) from a region of clutter is a knowledge of the volume or surface illuminated and the echo per unit volume, η, or per unit surface area, σ° (the backscatter coefficient).

Clutter-limited or noise-limited radar
In addition to any possible clutter there will also always be noise. The total  signal competing with the target return is thus clutter plus noise. In practice there is often either no clutter or clutter dominates and the noise can be ignored. In the first case the radar is said to be Noise Limited, in the second it is Clutter Limited.

Volume clutter 
Rain, hail, snow and chaff are examples of volume clutter. For example, suppose an airborne target, at range , is within a rainstorm. What is the effect on the detectability of the target?

First find the magnitude of the clutter return. Assume that the clutter fills the cell containing the target, that scatterers are statistically independent and that the scatterers are uniformly distributed through the volume. The clutter volume illuminated by a pulse can be calculated from the beam widths and the pulse duration, Figure 1.

The volume of the illuminated cell is thus:

For small angles this simplifies to:

The clutter is assumed to be a large number of independent scatterers that fill the cell containing the target uniformly. The clutter return from the volume is calculated as for the normal radar equation but the radar cross section is replaced by the product of the volume backscatter coefficient, and the clutter cell volume as derived above.  The clutter return is then

where
 = transmitter power (Watts)
 = gain of the transmitting antenna
 = effective aperture (area) of the receiving antenna
 = distance from the radar to the target

A correction must be made to allow for the fact that the illumination of the clutter is not uniform across the beamwidth.  In practice the beam shape will approximate to a sinc function which itself approximates to a Gaussian function.  The correction factor is found by integrating across the beam width the Gaussian approximation of the antenna. The corrected back scattered power is

A number of simplifying substitutions can be made.
The receiving antenna aperture is related to its gain by:

and the antenna gain is related to the two beamwidths by:

The same antenna is generally used both for transmission and reception thus the received clutter power is:

If the Clutter Return Power is greater than the System Noise Power then the Radar is clutter limited and the Signal to Clutter Ratio must be equal to or greater than the Minimum Signal to Noise Ratio for the target to be detectable.

From the radar equation the return from the target itself will be

with a resulting expression for the signal to clutter ratio of

The implication is that when the radar is noise limited the variation of signal to noise ratio is an inverse fourth power.  Halving the distance will cause the signal to noise ratio to increase (improve) by a factor of 16. When the radar is volume clutter limited, however, the variation is an inverse square law and halving the distance will cause the signal to clutter to improve by only 4 times.

Since

it follows that

Clearly narrow beamwidths and short pulses are required to reduce the effect of clutter by reducing the volume of the clutter cell. If pulse compression is used then the appropriate pulse duration to be used in the calculation is that of the compressed pulse, not the transmitted pulse.

Problems in calculating signal to volume clutter ratio 
A problem with volume clutter, e.g. rain, is that the volume illuminated may not be completely filled, in which case the fraction filled must be known, and the scatterers may not be uniformly distributed. Consider a beam 10° in elevation. At a range of 10 km the beam could cover from ground level to a height of 1750 metres. There could be rain at ground level but the top of the beam could be above cloud level. In the part of the beam containing rain the rainfall rate will not be constant. One would need to know how the rain was distributed to make any accurate assessment of the clutter and the signal to clutter ratio. All that can be expected from the equation is an estimate to the nearest 5 or  10 dB.

Surface clutter 
The surface clutter return depends upon the nature of the surface, its roughness, the grazing angle (angle the beam makes with the surface), the frequency and the polarisation. The reflected signal is the phasor sum of a large number of individual returns from a variety of sources, some of them capable of movement (leaves, rain drops, ripples) and some of them stationary (pylons, buildings, tree trunks). Individual samples of clutter vary from one resolution cell to another (spatial variation) and vary with time for a given cell (temporal variation).

Beam filling 

For a target close to the Earth's surface such that the earth and target are in the same range resolution cell one of two conditions are possible.  The most common case is when the beam intersects the surface at such an angle that the area illuminated at any one time is only a fraction of the surface intersected by the beam as illustrated in Figure 2.

Pulse length limited case 
For the pulse length limited case the area illuminated depends upon the azimuth width of the beam and the length of the pulse, measured along the surface. The illuminated patch has a width in azimuth of

.

The length measured along the surface is

.

The area illuminated by the radar is then given by

For 'small' beamwidths this approximates to

The clutter return is then

    Watts
 
Substituting for the illuminated area 

    Watts

where  is the back scatter coefficient of the clutter.
Converting  to degrees and putting in the numerical values gives

    Watts

The expression for the target return remains unchanged thus the signal to clutter ratio is

    Watts

This simplifies to

In the case of surface clutter the signal to clutter now varies inversely with R. Halving the distance only causes a doubling of the ratio (a factor of two improvement).

Problems in calculating clutter for the pulse length limited case 
There are a number of problems in calculating the signal to clutter ratio. The clutter in the main beam is extended over a range of grazing angles and the backscatter coefficient depends upon grazing angle. Clutter will appear in the antenna sidelobes, which again will involve a range of grazing angles and may even involve clutter of a different nature.

Beam width limited case 
The calculation is similar to the previous examples, in this case the illuminated area is

which for small beamwidths simplifies to

The clutter return is as before

    Watts
 
Substituting for the illuminated area 

   Watts

This can be simplified to:

   Watts

Converting  to degrees

   Watts

The target return remains unchanged thus

Which simplifies to

As in the case of Volume Clutter the Signal to clutter ratio follows an inverse square law.

General problems in calculating surface clutter 
The general significant problem is that the backscatter coefficient cannot in general be calculated and must be measured. The problem is the validity of measurements taken in one location under one set of conditions being used for a different location under different conditions. Various empirical formulae and graphs exist which enable an estimate to be made but the results need to be used with caution.

Clutter folding

Clutter folding is a term used in describing "clutter" seen by radar systems. Clutter folding becomes a problem when the range extent of the clutter (seen by the radar) exceeds the pulse repetition frequency interval of the radar, and it no longer provides adequate clutter suppression, and the clutter "folds" back in range. The solution to this problem is usually to add fill pulses to each coherent dwell of the radar, increasing the range over which clutter suppression is applied by the system.

The tradeoff for doing this is that adding fill pulses will degrade the performance, due to wasted transmitter power and a longer dwell time.

References

Atmosphere
Radar theory
Radio frequency propagation